Uroš Mitjev (born 23 June 1993 in Šabac) is a Serbian sprint canoer.
He is member of canoe club Zorka in Šabac. 
He won three medals in 2013:
 Silver medal on European U23 canoe sprint championship in Poznan, Poland (k2 200m)
 Silver medal on World U23 championship in Welland, Canada (k2 200m)
 Bronze medal on World Cup I, Szeged, Hungary (k2 200m)

He's partner is Nebojša Grujić (1991), also member of canoe sprint club Zorka from Šabac. They have been competing together since 2012, and they first results were:
 1st and gold medal on International Regata Piestany, Slovakia in k2 200m U23
 1st place in B final on European U23 canoe sprint championship in Montemor-O-Velho, Portugal
 1st place and gold medal in State Championship in Backa Palanka, Serbia in K2 200m

He currently lives in Novi Sad and he is also student of medical faculty in University of Novi Sad.

External links
 Mitjev at Thesports.org

Living people
1993 births
Serbian male canoeists
Sportspeople from Šabac